This is a list of high-altitude lakes in Switzerland. It includes all significant lakes, natural or artificial, with an area over 4 hectares and a height over 800 metres above sea level. This height approximately corresponds to the transition between the foothill zone and the montane zone, in the Alps and in the Jura Mountains. Lakes can be found up to elevations of almost 3000 metres, where is the climatic snow line in the Alps. For each lake, the culminating point of the drainage basin is indicated, along with the river basin of which it is part.

For a list of artificial lakes only, see List of dams and reservoirs in Switzerland. For a general list of lakes, see List of lakes of Switzerland.

Distribution of mountain lakes by canton

Main list

See also
 List of glaciers in Switzerland
 List of mountains of Switzerland
 List of lakes of Switzerland

Notes and references

External links
Mountain lakes (MySwitzerland.com)

Switzerland
Mountain
Lakes, mountain
Lists of tourist attractions in Switzerland